Eupomatia is a genus of three flowering shrub species of the Australian continent, constituting the only genus in the ancient family Eupomatiaceae. The Eupomatiaceae have been recognised by most taxonomists and classified in the plant order Magnoliales. The three species of shrubs or small trees grow naturally in the rainforests and humid eucalypt forests of eastern Australia and New Guinea. The type species Eupomatia laurina was described in 1814 by Robert Brown.

Description 
 Trees or subshrubs rhizomatous with soft starchy basal tubers, indumentum absent or present on the branches
 Leaves distichous, simple, entire, penninerved, brochidodromous, petiolate, without stipules with secretory, aromatic idioblasts,  stomata paracytic or actinocytic, only on the undersides of leaves
 Stems with nodes (5-)7(-11)-lacunar, radii uni- or multicellular, medulla not septate
 Plants hermaphrodites
 Flowers perfect, cream or red and yellow, 30–40 mm in diameter, actinomorphic, spiral, epigynous, solitary, axillary or terminal, sometimes in fascicles of 2-3, with 1-2 fused bracts forming a calyptra Receptacle urceolate (shaped like an urn). Sepals and petals absent; stamens 20-100, tetrasporangiate, petaloids, gynostemium short, wide, anthers basifixed, introrse, longitudinally dehiscent, connectivum elongated; staminodes intrastaminal 40-80, petaloid, with glands in the blade and at the edge; stamens and staminodes basally fused forming a deciduous synandrium; carpels 13-70, syncarpous, fused for more than half of their length, forming a flattened apical structure; styles absent, stigmas flat, papillose; ovules 2-11 per carpel, anatropous, apotropous, bitegmic, crassinucellate; placentation sublaminar, in two rows along the ventral side of the carpel.
 Fruit compound in fleshy berry
 Seeds with endosperm fleshy to oily, ruminate, embryo straight, small, with two cotyledons
 Pollen subglobose, grooved; exine atectate, psilate
 Chromosomal number: n = 10, 2n = 20.

Ecology 
Protogynous and autocompatible flowers, with a reduction in selfing through herkogamy, diurnal synchronization of anthesis and the tendency of the same plant to not flower on two consecutive days. Anthesis lasts one or two days, at the height the flower behaves functionally as a female, showing its gynoecium and with open staminodes, while the stamens remain below the flower. The flower later behaves as a male with the intrastaminal staminodes folded inwards hiding the gynoecium and with erect stamens. The staminodes secrete an oily exudate and emit a fruity smell that attracts beetles, particularly of the genus Elleschodes (Curculionidae), that visit the flowers in both phases, in addition the synandria fall to the ground (cantharophily pollination). The fruit is sweet and aromatic and it is dispersed by birds and mammals (zoochory). The fruit is also eaten by humans.

The species are native to the tropical habitats of the rain forest, from sea level to an altitude of 1,300 m.

Phytochemistry 

Plants contain unusual lignans and alkaloids (sampangine, eupolauridine, eupomatidine-1, liriodenine and lanuginosine, antimicrobials and antifungals) such as proanthocyanidins, cyanidin and flavonoids, in particular velutin. Iridoids, flavonols and ellagic acid are absent. Cyanogenesis absent.

Uses 
The colourful wood of E. laurina is valued as is its fruit, which is used to make traditional Australian drinks, preserves and pastries.

Systematic position 
Eupomatiaceae associates specifically with the family Annonaceae in the order Magnoliales from their botanical descriptions. The Angiosperm Phylogeny Website considers Eupomatiaceae a sister group of the family Annonaceae in the terminal clade in the order’s evolution (see AP-website). The APG II system, of 2003 (unchanged from the APG system, of 1998), also recognizes this family, and assigns it to the order Magnoliales in the clade magnoliids.

Species 

 Eupomatia barbata  – formally described in 2002
Commonly named northern small bolwarra. Endemic only in north-eastern Queensland, Australia. Shrubs up to 1 m tall.
 Eupomatia bennettii  – formally described in 1858
Commonly named small bolwarra. Endemic only in north-eastern New South Wales and south-eastern Queensland, Australia. Shrubs up to 1.4 m tall, little branching; leaves oblanceolate to oblong, 80-200 mm by 25-50 mm, petiole decurrent on the stem; flowers up to about 25 mm diameter, pedicels 5 mm; stamens 8-12 mm, yellow with the inside stained red; dark red staminodes; fruits obconic, 20-30 mm diameter, green turning yellow on ripening.
 Eupomatia laurina  – formally described in 1814
Commonly named bolwarra  or copper laurel. Grows naturally in New Guinea and eastern Australia. Shrubs or small trees up to 10 m tall, highly branched; leaves shiny, oblong-elliptical, 70-120 mm long by 20-50 mm wide, petiole non-decurrent of 3 mm; flowers 20 mm in diameter; stamens white to cream, off-white staminodes; fruits greenish-yellow of 15-20 mm diameter, brown when ripe. Pollinated by the weevil Elleschodes hamiltoni.

Notes 
There was no agreement in the references consulted as to whether the calyptra derived from the calyx or a bract. Perianths do not appear when the calyptra develops, so that, as mentioned, the plants have flowers without petals. When the calyptra’s first floral organs appear stamens and staminodes emerge arranged in a regular pattern following the Fibonacci sequence joined in sequences of 13 and 21 (E. bennettii) or only 13 (E. laurina). The carpels are also arranged in the same way in spirals of eight and 13 (E. bennettii) and of five and eight (E. laurina).

References 

 Endress, P.K. 1993. Eupomatiaceae. En: Kubitzki, K., Rohwer, J.G. & Bittrich, V. (Editores). The Families and Genera of Vascular Plants. II. Flowering Plants - Dicotyledons. Springer-Verlag.
 Watson, L., and Dallwitz, M.J. 1992 onwards. The families of flowering plants: descriptions, illustrations, identification, and information retrieval. Version: 29 July 2006. https://web.archive.org/web/20070103200438/http://delta-intkey.com/

External links 
 Eupomatiaceae in L. Watson and M.J. Dallwitz (1992 onwards). The families of flowering plants: descriptions, illustrations, identification, information retrieval. Version: 3 May 2006. https://web.archive.org/web/20070103200438/http://delta-intkey.com/. 
 NCBI Taxonomy Browser
 links at CSDL, Texas* Eupomatia laurina, flor abriéndose
 Cut flower of Eupomatia laurina
 Eupomatia, flower in female phase
 Eupomatia bennettii, flower and young fruit
 Eupomatia laurina, overview
 Eupomatia laurina, dry fruit

Magnoliales
Magnoliales genera